The Division of Farrer is an Australian electoral division in the state of New South Wales.

Geography
Since 1984, federal electoral division boundaries in Australia have been determined at redistributions by a redistribution committee appointed by the Australian Electoral Commission. Redistributions occur for the boundaries of divisions in a particular state, and they occur every seven years, or sooner if a state's representation entitlement changes or when divisions of a state are malapportioned.

History

The division was created in 1949 and is named for William Farrer, an agricultural scientist.

The division is located in the far south-western area of the state and includes Albury, Corowa, Narrandera, Leeton, Griffith, Deniliquin, Hay, Balranald and Wentworth.

The sitting member, since the 2001 election, is Sussan Ley, a member of the Liberal Party of Australia and their deputy leader since 2022.

It has always been a safe non-Labor seat, alternating between the Liberal Party and the National Party.  All four of its members have gone on to serve in cabinet, most notably Tim Fischer, leader of the National Party from 1990 to 1999 and Deputy Prime Minister from 1996 to 1999 during the first half of the Howard Government.

Members

Election results

References

External links
 Division of Farrer - Australian Electoral Commission

Electoral divisions of Australia
Constituencies established in 1949
1949 establishments in Australia